The Irish Universities’ Association (IUA) is the representative body of the eight universities within the Republic of Ireland and is based at NUI offices in Merrion Square, Dublin. It is a non-profit-making body. In 1972, the five Heads of the universities in Ireland at that time decided to establish a conference to provide a forum for joint action on matters of common concern. The Association was created in the late 1970s as the Conference of Heads of Irish Universities (CHIU)  and formally incorporated in 1997 with charitable status and adopted its current name in 2005.

The IUA's mission is to collectively formulate and pursue policies that advance education and research in the universities of Ireland. The IUA Council consists of the presidents/provosts of each college. There are also five standing groups: Financial, Research, Registrar, HR and Secretaries. The IUA periodically issues reports and reviews in pursuit of its policies.

The IUA is a "Collective Full Member" of the European University Association.

Members of the IUA
Dublin City University
Maynooth University
University of Galway 
Technological University Dublin 
University of Dublin (Trinity College)
University College Cork 
University College Dublin   
University of Limerick

The initial members of the CHIU were the former University Colleges of Dublin, Cork and Galway, the then St Patrick's College, Maynooth, and Trinity College Dublin. On gaining university status, DCU and UL joined in 1990. Technological University Dublin formally joined .

See also
 Open access in the Republic of Ireland

References

External links
 Official website

College and university associations and consortia in Europe
Educational organisations based in Ireland
Members of the European Research Consortium for Informatics and Mathematics